Inga interfluminensis is a species of plant in the family Fabaceae. It is found only in Colombia.

References

interfluminensis
Flora of Colombia
Vulnerable plants
Taxonomy articles created by Polbot
Plants described in 1943